Metaon was a town of ancient Lesbos.

The site of Metaon is tentatively located near modern Ta Meti/Plagia.

References

Populated places in the ancient Aegean islands
Former populated places in Greece
Ancient Lesbos